Pavey & Matthews Pty Ltd v Paul, is a leading Australian case concerning unjust enrichment, and an award for restitution based on quantum meruit.

Facts
Pavey & Matthews renovated a cottage belonging to Mrs. Paul  Their contract was orally agreed, and at the end of the renovation Pavey & Mathews were paid a sum of $36,000—only a portion of what they claimed they were owed; Pavey & Matthews said the prevailing rate was $63,000, and were still owed $27,000. Because the contract was not in writing (as required by the Builders Licensing Act) it was considered unenforceable. Even though the contract was unenforceable, the question that the case needed to answer, was whether a quantum meruit claim could be independent of a contract and thus avoid the Licensing Act.

Judgment
The High Court of Australia (Brennan J dissenting) held that the case was independent of the Act, and the extra $27,000 was awarded. The majority—Deane J, Mason J and Wilson J--rejected that the claim was based on an implied oral contract, falling foul of the Act . The basis was not Mrs Paul’s promise to pay, but rather the work done and its acceptance by Mrs Paul. The Licensing Act was designed to allow building owners to withdraw from their oral commitments, not to enable them to pay nothing for work that they requested and approved. Pavey & Mathews would have received less restitution only if Mrs Paul had withdrawn her promise before the work had begun, but the builders had gone ahead anyway. Also, the quantum meruit (the amount rewarded) could be no higher than the objective market rate for the work, even if Mrs Paul’s promise was for a higher price.

Deane J said the following:

See also
English unjust enrichment law

References

Unjust enrichment
High Court of Australia cases
1987 in case law
1987 in Australian law